Buczek  (German Butschek) is a village in the administrative district of Gmina Ujazd, within Strzelce County, Opole Voivodeship, in south-western Poland.

References

Buczek